

Gold rush era (1896-1899)

During the gold rush some gold was found in the creek beds, but most was in the valley gravels near and in the bedrock. The recovery had two steps: bringing the gravel containing gold to the surface and then separating the gold from the gravel using water and gravity separation. As a result, access to water was important since it was necessary for the separation process and could also be used to thaw the permanently frozen ground and to wash down gravels from the upper terraces.

Methods of bringing out the gold

The first step of recovery was to bring the mixture of gold and dirt from the ground to the surface or from a hillside down to a bench. There were two methods: digging a shaft or using pressurized water to either wash soil down a hillside or suck it up from the ground.

Underground mining

Most of the gold was below the surface. The miners first had to thaw the permafrost before they could dig. A fire burning all night was used to soften the ground. This would then thaw to a depth of about 14 inches and the gravel could be removed. The process was repeated until the gold was reached. No support of the shaft was necessary because of the permafrost. However, the fire could produce noxious gas which had to be removed. Over time steam for thawing the ground was also taken into use. Normally digging was done during the winter. The cold air would sink down into the shaft and renew the air automatically. At the same time, the temperature meant that shafts, apart from not needing support, were not at risk of being filled with water. A dump was made that could be sluiced during the summer. In the dump, the gold was protected from theft because it was invisible in frozen gravel.

Hydraulic methods and mining in benches

Jets were applied to wash down part of a hillside for sluicing. The stream could be so strong that it would reflect a crowbar swung at it. When gravity could not be used for sluicing, a lift could be applied; it used pressurized water, introduced at the bottom, to suck up a mixture of water and gravel. This could also be an alternative to shaft mining as seen on picture 2. Hydraulic methods were introduced during the California gold rush and would be used later at Nome.

Separation methods

All methods required water and because of that they could only be used during the summer. Panning for gold was the simplest method of recovering gold, but mostly used for prospecting since it was slow. A faster way was by a rocker box or by sluicing. Dirt was filled into the box or sluice together with water and rocking movements or gravity would make the gold particle go to the bottom whereas sand and fine gold particles would flow off with the water. Further purification of the gold could be done with mercury that would amalgamate with gold only and leave fine sand particles out. A magnet could be used to separate fine magnetic sand from gold dust.

Later operations (1910-1950)

Dredges were used in the Klondike River valley from 1910-1950. A dredge could do the work of 2,400 persons while operated by 10-12. It would create a pool of water that moved along with it as it dug up gravel in front and deposited it behind itself. Inside sand and gold particles were separated from rocks and then gold from sand. By sweeping from side to side around a pole it could cover an area wider than itself. 

Today a mixture of hydraulic methods together with bulldozers are used.

References

Klondike Gold Rush